Chand Nizami is an Indian sufi singer. He's main lead singer in indian sufi band Nizami Bandhu from 1999 and part of band from last 1983 years. Before Chand his elder brother was main leader of band Nizami Bandhu after his death in 2003 Chand started leading the band with his two nephew Shadab Nizami and Sohrab Faridi Nizami. Chand along with his nephew Shadab Faridi Nizami also sang for movies like Yahaan, Bajrangi Bhaijaan and Rockstar

Career 
In 2011 he became known for his song "Kun Faya Kun" from the film Rockstar. Chand used to sing at Dargah Hazrat Nizamuddin, Delhi from his early age, He started singing when he was 6 years old. His father Mahmood Nizami used to take with him when he performed.

References

Living people
Singers from Delhi
Performers of Sufi music
Bollywood playback singers
1962 births